Guy Ratcliff Sparrow (2 July 1877 – 4 January 1958) was an English cricketer who played for Derbyshire during the 1905 season.

Sparrow was born in Aston, Warwickshire, the son of Walter Sparrow and his wife Emma Gertrude Ratcliff. His father was assistant surgeon to the 9th Warwickshire Rifle Volunteer Corps. Sparrow took part in the Second Boer War as a Private in the 8th Coy, 4th Bn. Imperial Yeomanry.

Sparrow made two County Championship appearances for Derbyshire during the 1905 season. In his debut match in June against Northamptonshire he scored 67 in the first innings, and was off the mark with a few runs in his three remaining innings. Sparrow was a right-handed batsman and played 4 innings in 2 first-class matches with an average of 18.75 and a top score of 64.

Sparrow died in Burton-on-Trent at the age of 80.

References

1877 births
1958 deaths
English cricketers
Derbyshire cricketers
British Army personnel of the Second Boer War